The Governor of Hawaii Island was the royal governor or viceroy of the Island of Hawaii during the Kingdom of Hawaii. The Governor of Hawaii was usually a Hawaiian chief or prince and could even be a woman. There were no restriction of women in government in the House of Nobles or Governorship of the islands. The Governor had authority over the island of Hawaii, the biggest island in the kingdom, and it was up to the governor to appoint lieutenant governors to assisted them. The governor had replaced the old Aliʻis of the islands, but sovereignty remained with the king. The island governors were under the jurisdiction of the Ministers of the Interiors.

Role 
The 1840 Constitution of the Kingdom of Hawaii states:

Abolition
After King Kalākaua was forced to sign the Bayonet Constitution in 1887, the island governorships began to be viewed as wasteful expenses for the monarchy. The governors and governesses at the time (who were mainly royals or nobles) were also viewed unfit to appoint the native police forces and condemned for "their refusal to accept their removal or reform by sheriffs or the marshal". The island governorships were abolished by two acts: the first act, on December 8, 1887, transferred the power of the police appointment to the island sheriffs, and the second, An Act To Abolish The Office Of Governor,  which officially abolished the positions, on August 23, 1888. King Kalākaua refused to approve the 1888 act, but his veto was overridden by two-thirds of the legislature. These positions were restored under the An Act To Establish A Governor On Each Of The Islands Of Oahu, Maui, Hawaii and Kauai on November 14, 1890, with the effective date of January 1, 1891. One significant change was this act made it illegal for a woman to be governor ending the traditional practice of appointing female royals and nobles as governess. Kalākaua died prior to reappointing any of the island governors, but his successor Liliuokalani restored the positions at different dates between 1891 and 1892. After the overthrow of the Kingdom of Hawaii, the Provisional Government of Hawaii repealed the 1890 act and abolished these positions on February 28, 1893 for the final time.

List of governors of Hawaii Island

See also
List of governors of Hawaii
Governors of Oahu
 Governors of Kauai
 Governors of Maui
 Aliʻi nui of Hawaii
 Mayor of Hawaii County

References

 
Hawaii